Palace of Sports or Sports Palace is a generic name of comprehensive indoors sports venues introduced in the Soviet Union (compare with Palace of Culture) of big size that includes various sports halls and auxiliary space. Primarily designated to host sports events in front of spectators.

As a name it is still used in a number of post-Soviet states. Many of them had standard architectural design. Some of them were renamed, e.g., into Palace of Concerts and Sports.

The term is also used in other countries. For example, the term is Palacio de los Deportes in Hispanophone countries or Palais des Sports in Francophone countries.

Notable Palaces of Sports

Other former Soviet states

 Kyiv Palace of Sports (built in 1960), Kyiv, Ukraine
 Meteor Palace of Sports (1980), Dnipro, Ukraine
 Tbilisi Sports Palace (built in 1961), Tbilisi, Georgia
 Vilnius Palace of Concerts and Sports (1971), Vilnius, Lithuania was included in the "Registry of Cultural Values" in 2006.
 Sports Palace Aukštaitija, Panevėžys, Lithuania
 Minsk Sports Palace, Minsk, Belarus
 Kazakhstan Sports Palace, Nur-Sultan, Kazakhstan
 Boris Alexandrov Sports Palace, Oskemen, Kazakhstan
 Baluan Sholak Sports Palace, Almaty, Kazakhstan

Other countries

 Berlin Sportpalast, Germany, mostly known for its Nazi Party rallies
 Istana Olahraga Gelora Bung Karno (1961), Jakarta, Indonesia
 Royal Bafokeng Sports Palace, Rustenburg, South Africa

Palacio de los Deportes

 Palacio de los Deportes, Mexico City, Mexico
 Palacio de los Deportes, Heredia, Costa Rica
 Palacio de los Deportes Virgilio Travieso Soto, Santo Domingo, Dominican Republic
 Palacio de los Deportes del Cibao, Santiago de los Caballeros, Dominican Republic
 Palacio de Recreación y Deportes, Mayagüez, Puerto Rico
 Palacio de los Deportes de Torrevieja, Torrevieja, Spain.
 Palacio de los Deportes de La Rioja, Logroño, Spain

Palacio de Deportes
 Palacio de Deportes de Gijón
 Palacio de Deportes de Santander
 Palacio de Deportes de la Comunidad de Madrid
 Palacio de Deportes de Murcia
 Palacio de Deportes de Granada
 Palacio de Deportes de San Pablo
 Palacio de Deportes Mediterráneo, Almería, Spain

Palais des Sports
 Palais des Sports (disambiguation), for French venues

Palazzo dello Sport
 Palazzo dello Sport (disambiguation), for Italian venues

Other Soviet entertainment complexes (Dvorets) 
 Palace of Culture (Palace of Arts and Creativity i.e. Palace of Arts "Ukraina")
 Pioneers Palace (House of Young Pioneers)
 People's House, previous term that existed in the Russian Empire
 House of the Red Army (DKA)
 House of Military Officers
 Palace of the Soviets (special case)

See also
 Sports complex

References

Sports venues in Russia
Sports venues built in the Soviet Union